Too Young to Fight It is the debut full-length album by American dance-rock band Young Love. The album was recorded in New York City, New York and features songwriting, production and vocals from musician Dan Keyes. The album was released on January 30, 2007 in the United States.

Track listing
 "Discotech" – 3:54
 "Give Up" – 3:08
 "Closer to You" – 3:28
 "Too Young to Fight It" – 3:21
 "Nameless One" – 4:43
 "Find a New Way" – 2:52
 "Tell Me" – 3:29
 "Take It or Leave It" – 3:03
 "Tragedy" – 2:57
 "Underneath the Night Sky" – 4:13
 "Close Your Eyes" – 3:00

Singles
 "Find a New Way"
 "Too Young to Fight It"

External links
Official Young Love website

2007 debut albums
Young Love (band) albums
Albums produced by Dante Ross
Island Records albums